Nuclear Holocausts: Atomic War in Fiction, 1895–1984 was written by Paul Brians and published in 1987. This comprehensive study covers nuclear holocaust fiction published in English-language works between 1895 and 1984. Brians notes that 1895 marked the first appearance of an atomic weapon in fiction: Robert Cromie's Crack of Doom. The latter date marks the conclusion of this study's time span.

Brians' work examines only fiction actually depicting nuclear war and its aftermath. He does not include works of "future holocaust" where the triggering incident is not fully explained in the work. The included bibliography covers over 800 items, including novels, stories, and films from the post-holocaust genre. The included titles are arranged by author and include a brief synopsis of each work. The author has provided an online version of the published work, complete with updated sources.

Notes

1987 books
Books about nuclear issues
American post-apocalyptic novels